WIOZ (550 AM) is a radio station broadcasting an adult standards format. It is licensed to Pinehurst, North Carolina, United States. The station is currently owned by Muirfield Broadcasting, Inc. and features programming from Westwood One.

History
WIOZ changed from all-news radio to the Music of Your Life format in 1999, when WIOZ-FM changed to adult contemporary.

References

External links
Official website

FCC History Cards for WIOZ

IOZ